Actihema jirani is a species of moth of the family Tortricidae. It is found in Uganda. The habitat consists of open spaces close to mountainous rainforests.

The wingspan is 12–15 mm. The forewings are bicoloured. The basal half is fuscous intermixed with brown scales and with black marks and the distal half is whitish. The hindwings are light fuscous, with darker transverse striae.

Etymology
The species name is derived from jirani (the Swahili word for neighbour) and refers to the similarity to Actihema hemiacta.

References

Endemic fauna of Uganda
Moths described in 2010
Cochylini
Moths of Africa